Curculionichthys sabaji is a species of catfish in the family Loricariidae. It is native to the Xingu River basin in Brazil. The species reaches 2.4 cm (0.9 inches) SL. It was described in 2015 by Fábio Fernandes Roxo, Gabriel Souza da Costa e Silva, Luz E. Orrego, and Claudio Oliveira, alongside the description of the genus Curculionichthys to include several species formerly classified in the genus Hisonotus.

References 

Loricariidae
Fish described in 2015